Elisabeth Brooks Luyties (July 2, 1951 – September 7, 1997) was a Canadian actress. She is probably best remembered for her role as the evil, leather-clad siren Marsha Quist in The Howling (1981). Her other film appearances included Deep Space (1988), and The Forgotten One (1989), starring Kristy McNichol.

Life and career
Brooks was born on July 2, 1951, in Toronto, Ontario, and adopted by William Harrison "Sandy" Luyties Jr.  and his wife Joan (née Brooks) when she was six months old. Brooks has two brothers and two sisters: Judson, Jonica, Megan, and Seth. To family and friends, Brooks was known as Lissa.

She began her acting career aged five, encompassing both stage and screen. She started appearing in television roles in the mid-1970s and managed to pursue her acting career as a single mother while working a variety of jobs to support herself and her son. She had a brief role in Rich Man, Poor Man (1976), and then appeared regularly on the soap opera Days of Our Lives, and in popular television series such as The Rockford Files, Kolchak: The Night Stalker, Hart to Hart, Starsky and Hutch, The Six Million Dollar Man, and Emergency!

After a two and half year struggle with brain cancer, Brooks died in Haven Hospice near her home in Palm Springs, California, at the age of 46. Brooks was survived by her children and best friend Kristy McNichol, her death coming four days shy of McNichol's 35th birthday.

References

External links
 
 

1951 births
1997 deaths
20th-century American actresses
Actresses from Palm Springs, California
Actresses from Toronto
Burials at Forest Lawn Cemetery (Cathedral City)
Canadian film actresses
Canadian soap opera actresses
Canadian television actresses
Deaths from brain cancer in the United States
Musicians from Toronto
20th-century Canadian women singers
Canadian expatriate actresses in the United States